James Melvin Newman (June 19, 1903 – February 13, 1963) was an Ontario merchant and political figure. He represented Rainy River in the Legislative Assembly of Ontario as a Liberal-Labour member from 1945 to 1951.

He was born in Cartwright, Manitoba, the son of James Newman, and educated there. In 1928, he married Birdella Sweeney. Newman was an automobile dealer and farm implement distributor. He served on the town council for Fort Frances. He was also a member of the Masons and a Shriner.

References
 Canadian Parliamentary Guide, 1947, GP Normandin

External links 

1903 births
1963 deaths
Liberal-Labour Ontario MPPs
People from Fort Frances
People from Pembina Valley Region, Manitoba